Joel Chan is a Singapore-born, Australian-based photographer.

Career
Chan's first assignment was with SG Design Fusion, a boutique publishing firm. He also accepted a commission with his alma mater, University of Newcastle, Australia.
Chan was at the same time, providing volunteer photography services with charities Singapore Red Cross and Student Advisory Centre. A notable event was his provision of photography coverage for a 20 kilometre charity swim from Batam Island to Singapore Island.

His client list includes Leica Microsystems, Chanel, Lexus, GAC Marine, GAC Logistics, PSB Academy, Singapore Airshow and A2A Capital Management.

Company and affiliations
In 2007, Chan started his own company JC Photography, and shifted to the field of wedding photography. His work has been featured in a MediaCorp production, Style Weddings.

Chan has been a member of Nikon Professional Services (NPS) since 21 July 2008

References

External links 
 JC Photography Website

Singaporean photographers
Living people
Year of birth missing (living people)